Resolver may refer to:

 Resolver (Cuba), a do-it-yourself ethos in Cuba
 Resolver (electrical), a type of rotary electrical transformer used for measuring degrees of rotation
 Resolver (Veruca Salt album), a 2000 album by the band Veruca Salt
 Resolver (Shinhwa album), an album by the South Korean boy band Shinhwa
 Resolver (DNS), a set of software utilities used to resolve domain names of Internet resources
 Resolver, a specialized microarray data storage and analysis software package developed by Rosetta Biosoftware
 Resolver One, a Python-based spreadsheet
 Resolver (programming)